Aq Chali-ye Sofla (also Romanized as Āq Chalī-ye Soflá; also known as Āq Chalī) is a village in Soltanali Rural District, in the Central District of Gonbad-e Qabus County, Golestan Province, Iran. At the 2006 census, its population was 930, in 212 families.

References 

Populated places in Gonbad-e Kavus County